Barton Bushes is a  biological Site of Special Scientific Interest in Gloucestershire, notified in 1996.

The site has local names being Barton Larches and Meadows Larches.  It lies within the Cotswold Hills Environmentally Sensitive Area (ESA), and the Cotswolds Area of Outstanding Natural Beauty.

Flora and fauna

The site is of special interest as it supports the nationally rare Cotswold Pennycress (Thlaspi perfoliatum),
for unimproved limestone grassland and scrub and for its population of the nationally scarce Duke of Burgundy fritillary butterfly.

References

SSSI Source
 Natural England SSSI information on the citation
 Natural England SSSI information on the Barton Bushes unit

External links
 Natural England (SSSI information)

Sites of Special Scientific Interest in Gloucestershire
Sites of Special Scientific Interest notified in 1996
Cotswolds
Temple Guiting